Calophaca is a genus of flowering plants in the legume family, Fabaceae. It belongs to the subfamily Faboideae and is closely related to the genus Caragana. One of the subtaxa of Calophaca is Calophaca sinica which has historically been known to be economically profitable, but as an effect of overexploitation is becoming less profitable.

References

Hedysareae
Fabaceae genera